The women's rugby sevens tournament at the 2017 Southeast Asian Games was held from 19 to 20 August in Malaysia. In this tournament, 5 Southeast Asian teams will play in the women's competition.

All matches will be played at Petaling Jaya Stadium in Petaling Jaya.

Competition schedule
The following was the competition schedule for the women's rugby sevens competitions:

Participating nations
The following five teams participated in the women's competition.

  (LAO)
  (MAS)
  (PHI)
  (SGP)
  (THA)

Draw
There is no official draw since only 6 teams are participating in this competition. All teams are automatically drawn into one group.

Results 
All times are Malaysia Standard Time (UTC+8).

Group stage

Final round

Semi-finals

Bronze medal match

Gold medal match

See also
Men's tournament

References

External links
Official website

Women
2017 in women's rugby union
2017